The Musée Hébert is a museum located in the Hôtel de Montmorency-Bours at 85, rue du Cherche-Midi, in the 6th arrondissement of Paris, France. It has been closed since 2004 for renovations.

The museum is housed within the Petit-Montmorency, constructed in 1743 by the Comte de Montmorency, and former home of academic painter Ernest Hébert (1817–1908). After his adopted son's death in 1974, the building became state property and opened as a museum in 1984. Since 2004, the museum Hébert has been affiliated with the Musée d’Orsay, and indefinitely closed for renovations.

The museum contains collections of Hébert's work, furniture, decorative items, souvenirs, and photographs, set within rooms almost unchanged since the 18th century. His paintings include portraits of literary critic Jules Lemaître, and two noted grandes horizontales, La Païva and Madame de Loynes.

See also 
 List of museums in Paris

References 
 Musée d'Orsay: Musée Hébert
 RMN description (French)
 Evene description (French)
 "Cultured Clutter in a Paris Museum", New York Times, December 25, 1988
 Marc Jordan, "Delaroche at the Musée Hébert, Paris", The Burlington Magazine, Vol. 126, No. 981 (Dec. 1984), pp. 804–805.

Defunct art museums and galleries in Paris
National museums of France
Historic house museums in Paris
Art museums established in 1984
1984 establishments in France
Buildings and structures in the 6th arrondissement of Paris